Dafydd Ifans (born 21 April 1949) is a contemporary Welsh language novelist and translator, born in Aberystwyth in Ceredigion, west Wales.

Personal life

Dafydd Ifans was born in Aberystwyth, Wales in 1949. After finishing in Ysgol Gymraeg Aberystwyth in 1960, between 1960 and 1967 he studied at the Ardwyn Grammar School in Aberystwyth. In 1970 he got his BA-degree at the University of Wales in Bangor. In 1972 he got his diploma in palaeography and archive administration, and his MA in 1974.

From 1972 until 1975 he served a research assistant at the Department of Manuscripts and Records in the National Library of Wales. Later he became an assistant keeper in the same department, until 2002. In 2002 he became an assistant director and head of the special collections, and in 2005 he served as an assistant director and head of acquisitions in the same library.

Prizes

In 1974, Ifans won the Prose Medal at the National Eisteddfod of Wales.

Publications

 1974 - Eira gwyn yn Salmon
 1977 - Tyred Drosodd - Gohebiaeth Eluned Morgan a Nantlais gyda rhagymadrodd a nodiadau
 1980 - Ofn
 1980 - Y Mabinogion (with Rhiannon Ifans)
 1982 - William Salesbury and The Welsh Law
 1982 - The Diary of Francis Kilvert April–June 1870 (with Kathleen Hughes)
 1989 - Dathlwn Glod - Ysgol Gymraeg Aberystwyth 1939-1989
 1989 - The Diary of Francis Kilvert June–July 1870
 1992 - Annwyl Kate, Annwyl Saunders - Gohebiaeth 1923-1983 (with Saunders Lewis and Kate Roberts)
 1994 - Cofrestri Anghydffurfiol Cymru/Nonconformist Registers of Wales
 1997 - Taith y Pererin i'r teulu (with John Bunyan and Victor Mitchell)
 1998 - Trysorfa Cenedl - Llyfrgell Genedlaethol Cymru
 1998 - The Nation's Heritage - The National Library of Wales
 1998 - Y Mabinogion -Hud yr hen chwedlau Celtaidd
 2004 - Gwladfa Kyffin / Kyffin in Patagonia
 2007 - Annwyl Kate

References

Welsh-language writers
Welsh writers
People from Aberystwyth
Welsh Eisteddfod winners
1949 births
Living people
People educated at Ardwyn School, Aberystwyth